Final league standings for the 1913-14 St. Louis Soccer League.

History
This season, the league experienced a split caused by St. Leo's success the past few seasons.  St. Leo's was the only fully professional team in the league which led to its domination.  When the other teams attempted to ban professionals, St. Leo's left the SLSL and set up the Federal Park League.  The other teams formed the Robison Park League.

Federal Park League

Robison League

External links
St. Louis Soccer Leagues (RSSSF)
The Year in American Soccer - 1914

1913-14
1913–14 domestic association football leagues
1913–14 in American soccer
St Louis Soccer
St Louis Soccer